Belty (Belta) is a rural locality (a selo) in Kurchaloyevsky District, Chechnya.

Administrative and municipal status 
Municipally, Belty is incorporated into Yalkhoy-Mokhkskoye rural settlement. It is one of three settlements included in it.

Geography 

Belty is located on the left bank of the Gums River.

The nearest settlements to Belty are Akhkinchu-Borzoy in the north-east, Yalkhoy-Mokhk in the east, Koren-Benoy in the south-west, and Khidi-Khutor in the west.

History 
In 1944, after the genocide and deportation of the Chechen and Ingush people and the Chechen-Ingush ASSR was abolished, the village of Belty was renamed to Sagada, and settled by people from the neighbouring republic of Dagestan.

In 1957, when the Vaynakh people returned and the Chechen-Ingush ASSR was restored, the village regained its old Chechen name, Belta.

Population 
 2010 Census: 943
 2019 estimate: ?

According to the results of the 2010 Census, the majority of residents of Belta were ethnic Chechens.

Education 
Belty hosts one secondary school.

References 

Rural localities in Kurchaloyevsky District